Guilherme Tâmega is a Brazilian bodyboarding champion. 

Born 3 September 1972, in Rio de Janeiro, Brazil, Tamega won the Shark Island Challenge bodyboarding event three times in a row. He competed in the international bodyboarding World Tour.
Tâmega won six world titles, plus six runner-up places, and was twice crowned ISA World Bodyboarding Games champion.

References

Living people
Brazilian surfers
Bodyboarders
Year of birth missing (living people)